Elvin L. Martinez (born August 8, 1934) is an American politician and attorney in the state of Florida.

Martinez was born in West Tampa. He attended the University of Tampa and law school at Stetson University. He served in the Florida House of Representatives from 1966 to 1998. He is a member of the Democratic Party.

References

Living people
1934 births
People from Tampa, Florida
Florida lawyers
Democratic Party members of the Florida House of Representatives